Rugby is an unincorporated community in Haw Creek Township, Bartholomew County, in the U.S. state of Indiana.

History
A post office was established at Rugby in 1884, and remained in operation until it was discontinued in 1935.

Geography
(For those who rely upon old maps and street signs, that location is reached on Bartholomew County Road 1050 East roughly halfway between 700 North and 750 North, and is ENE of Hope, Indiana and NNW of Hartsville, Indiana.)

References

DeLorme's Indiana Atlas & Gazetteer, 2nd edition, 2000, p. 46

Unincorporated communities in Bartholomew County, Indiana
Unincorporated communities in Indiana